The 1978 Alan King Tennis Classic was a men's tennis tournament played on outdoor hard courts at the Caesars Palace in Las Vegas, Nevada in the United States that was part of the 1978 Colgate-Palmolive Grand Prix. It was the seventh edition of the tournament was held from April 24 through April 30, 1978. Harold Solomon won the singles title after Barazzutti had to forfeit in the second set due to illness induced by food poisoning. Solomon earned $50,000 first-prize money as well as 225 Grand Prix points.

Finals

Singles

 Harold Solomon defeated  Corrado Barazzutti 6–1, 3–0 ret.

Doubles
 Álvaro Fillol /  Jaime Fillol defeated  Bob Hewitt /  Raúl Ramírez 6–3, 7–6

References

External links
 ITF tournament edition details

 
Alan King Tennis Classic
Alan King Tennis Classic
Alan King Tennis Classic
Tennis in Las Vegas